Al Murqab is an area in Kuwait City, Kuwait. It is located in the Al Kuwayt governorate 8 miles (13 km) from Kuwait International Airport.

Nearby areas include As Salihiyah (0.5 nmi or 1 km), Jibla (0.6 nmi or 1.1 km), Al Kuwayt (0.2 nmi or 0.4 km), Umm Siddah (0.8 nmi or 1.5 km) and Al Mansuriyah (0.6 nmi or 1.1 km).

References

External links 
Satellite map at Maplandia.com

Populated places in Kuwait
Suburbs of Kuwait City